Apostolos Tsoptsis (born 9 August 1972) is a Greek association football player and the manager of Edessaikos.

Apostolos Tsoptsis was born on 29 August 1972 at Esovalta, a village near Krya Vrysi, Pella and plays as a defender. He started his football career in 1990 at his hometown's local team. In 1992, he was transferred to Edessaikos, with whom he appeared in the Alpha Ethniki and made his debut in a home Alpha Ethniki match against Athinaikos on 27 September 1992, which ended 4–2. After five years in the Edessa-based team, he moved to Ionikos in 1997.

References

1972 births
Living people
People from Krya Vrysi, Pella
Footballers from Central Macedonia
Greek footballers
Association football defenders
Super League Greece players
Ionikos F.C. players